Maarten Ducrot (born 8 April 1958, in Vlissingen) is a Dutch former professional road bicycle racer, and currently a cycling reporter for the Dutch television.

Biography
Ducrot rode the Tour de France five times, of which he finished four times. In his first Tour in 1985, he won the 9th stage. After the Tour, he was given the combativity award. He also competed in the team time trial event at the 1984 Summer Olympics.

Ducrot ended his professional cycling career in 1991, after which he worked as organisation advisor. Since 2004, he is a cycling reporter for the Dutch television program Studio Sport.

In January 2000, on the Dutch TV-show Reporter, he admitted that he had used cortisone and testosterone, as well as Synacthen, "a very bad medicine", and he still regrets using it. Ducrot said he used synacthen in 1982 when he was an amateur.

Major results

1982
 1st  Team time trial, UCI Road World Championships
1983
 3rd Overall Tour de l'Avenir
1984
 2nd Overall Étoile des Espoirs
1985
 Tour de France
1st Stage 9
 Combativity award Stage 1 & Overall
 1st Profronde van Wateringen
 5th Overall Giro di Puglia
1986
 1st Stage 2 Tour de Romandie
 1st Stage 7a Critérium du Dauphiné Libéré
 1st Stage 8 Coors Classic
1987
 1st Stage 5 (TTT) Tour of the Netherlands
 8th Overall Vuelta a Andalucía
1988
 1st GP de la Liberté Fribourg
 3rd Overall Vuelta a Andalucía
 7th Grand Prix Impanis-Van Petegem
 7th Rund um den Henninger Turm
 9th GP Stad Zottegem
1989
 3rd Road race, National Road Championships
 5th Overall Tour of the Netherlands
1990
 1st Profronde van Oostvoorne
 6th Druivenkoers-Overijse
1991
 10th GP Stad Zottegem

Grand Tour general classification results timeline

See also
 List of Dutch Olympic cyclists
 List of doping cases in cycling

References

External links 
 

Official Tour de France results for Maarten Ducrot

1958 births
Living people
Dutch male cyclists
Dutch Tour de France stage winners
Dutch sportspeople in doping cases
Doping cases in cycling
UCI Road World Champions (elite men)
UCI Road World Championships cyclists for the Netherlands
Olympic cyclists of the Netherlands
Cyclists at the 1984 Summer Olympics
Sportspeople from Vlissingen
Cyclists from Zeeland